Kern City may refer to:
 East Bakersfield, California, formerly known as Kern City
 Kern City, Bakersfield, California, a former unincorporated community